The manga series Ultimo is created by Hiroyuki Takei and Stan Lee (and his production company Pow Entertainment). The manga is published by Shueisha in their Jump Square magazine, beginning serialization in 2009. The chapters are later collected into tankōbon bound volumes by Shueisha. The first tankōbon was released on July 3, 2009, and the fifth on November 4, 2010.

Ultimo is licensed by Viz Media for an English adaptation in North America. Viz serialized the manga in the American Shonen Jump magazine before their February 2011 issue and later releases in volumes. The first volume was released on February 2, 2010.


Volumes list

References 

Ultimo